This is a tentative timeline of major events leading up to, during, and after the 2024 United States presidential election. This will be the first presidential election to be run with population data from the 2020 census. In addition to the dates mandated by the relevant federal laws such as those in the U.S. Constitution and the Electoral Count Act, several milestones have consistently been observed since the adoption of the conclusions of the 1971 McGovern–Fraser Commission.

2020 
 November 7: Joe Biden is declared the winner of the 2020 presidential election by a consensus of major news outlets projecting the results.
 December 18: The U.S. Supreme Court delivers its per curiam decision in Trump v. New York regarding the 2020 United States census, effectively allowing Trump's July 2020 presidential memorandum to stand, which ordered the Department of Commerce exclude the estimated counts of illegal immigrants. The per curiam decision vacated the U.S. District Court's previously ruling on the basis that the case was premature due to lack of standing and ripeness. Justice Stephen Breyer files a dissent, which was joined by Justices Sonia Sotomayor and Elena Kagan, arguing that the Court should have considered the case.
 December 31: The U.S. Census Bureau misses the deadline to deliver the 2020 census results and the new apportionment counts to outgoing President Donald Trump.

2021 
 January 6: January 6 United States Capitol attack: Trump supporters attack and storm the Capitol building in an attempt to stop the counting of the electoral votes.
 January 13: President Trump is impeached for a second time in relation to the events that took place the prior week.
 January 20: Inauguration Day: Joe Biden is inaugurated as president.
 February 13: Trump is acquitted by the Senate, maintaining his eligibility for a non-consecutive re-election bid.
 June 26: Trump begins a series of campaign-style rallies.
 November 20: President Biden and some of his aides inform some allies that he plans to run again in 2024.

2022 
 January 19: President Biden commits to keeping Vice President Kamala Harris as his running mate in 2024.
 February 27: Former President Donald Trump wins the 2022 CPAC straw poll by over 30 points.
 March 8: 2016 Democratic Party presidential nominee, former Secretary of State Hillary Clinton, declares she will not run again in 2024.
March 10: Republican Corey Stapleton, former Secretary of State of Montana, announces he has formed a formal exploratory committee for a possible run for president.
March 16: Donald Trump announces that if he runs for re-election, his former Vice President Mike Pence will not be his running mate.
April 14: The RNC votes unanimously to withdraw from the Commission on Presidential Debates.
April 15: RNC endorses prioritizing Iowa and New Hampshire's "first-in-the-nation" status.
July 1: Radio host Howard Stern declares his intent to run in 2024 as an independent.
July 25: Philosopher and political activist Jerome Segal declares his intent to run in 2024 as a Democrat, becoming the first notable minor challenger to President Biden.
August 5: The RNC names Milwaukee as the site for the 2024 Republican National Convention.
November 8: Midterm elections.
November 11: Republican Corey Stapleton, former Secretary of State of Montana, declares his intent to run in 2024 as a Republican, becoming the first confirmed candidate for the 2024 Republican primaries and the first notable minor challenger to President Trump. 
November 15: Former president Donald Trump announces his candidacy .
November 18–22: Republican Jewish Coalition conference, the first major "cattle call" event of the cycle, takes place in Las Vegas, Nevada. 
November 20: Former South Carolina Governor and ambassador to the UN Nikki Haley announced she's considering running for president.
December 1–3: The DNC’s rules and bylaws committee meets to finalize the primary schedule for the upcoming cycle.

2023
 January 6: Former National Security Advisor John Bolton declares his intent to mount a presidential bid.
 February 4: The Democratic National Committee approves a new primary calendar, moving South Carolina to February 3, followed by Nevada and New Hampshire on February 6, Georgia on February 13, and Michigan on February 27. Iowa, which traditionally goes first, would then be held later in the primary season. The DNC gives Georgia and New Hampshire an extended deadline of June to modify their state laws so they can comply with the new dates (New Hampshire state law mandates them to hold the first primary in the country, while Georgia state law requires them to hold both the Democratic and Republican primaries on the same day), but this remains unlikely to happen since both states have Republican-controlled state legislatures.
 February 14: Former UN ambassador Nikki Haley announces her bid for the Republican presidential nomination against President Donald Trump.
 March 4: Author Marianne Williamson announces her bid for the Democratic presidential nomination against incumbent President Joe Biden.
 March 5: Former Governor of Maryland Larry Hogan declares he will not run for the Republican presidential nomination in 2024.
 March 16: 2016 Independent presidential candidate Joe Exotic announced he is running for president from Federal prison.

2024 
January 22: Iowa Republican presidential caucuses (scheduled)
January 30: New Hampshire Republican primary (scheduled)
February 3: South Carolina Democratic primary
February 6: Democratic primaries in Nevada and New Hampshire (tentative)
February 13: Georgia Democratic primary (tentative)
February 27: Michigan Democratic primary
March 5: Super Tuesday
Summer: Conventions. Tradition states the party that holds the White House goes second.
July 15–18: 2024 Republican National Convention, Milwaukee 
2024 Democratic National Convention
November 5: (the Tuesday after the first Monday of November): Election Day.
December 10: (at least six days prior to the first Monday after the second Wednesday in December): the "safe harbor" deadline under the Electoral Count Act, where states must finally resolve any controversies over the selection of their electors of the Electoral College.
December 16: (the first Monday after the second Wednesday in December): The electors meet in their respective state capitals and the District of Columbia to formally vote for president and vice president. The number of states that prohibit faithless electors is subject to change. In 2020, 33 states and DC had such laws.

2025 
January 6: Electoral votes formally counted before a joint session of Congress; the President of the Senate formally announces the electoral result.
January 20: Inauguration Day.

References 

Timeline
2024
2024 timelines